John Andrew Kissel is an American politician. Kissel, a Republican, has been a state senator from Connecticut since 1993.

Kissel, a resident of Enfield, represents East Granby, Enfield, Granby, Somers, Suffield, Windsor, and Windsor Locks in the Connecticut Senate.

Kissel was born Worcester, Massachusetts and raised in Windsor. He is a graduate of the University of Connecticut and the Western New England College School of Law.

Kissel is currently employed as a corporate attorney for Eversource, an energy company serving much of Connecticut.

Political positions 
Kissel is a noted opponent of the legalization of marijuana, and has voted against legislation that would legalize the consumption or production of marijuana in Connecticut.

In May 2021, Kissel was the sole Nay vote on a bill to end prison gerrymandering in Connecticut. Kissel's district contains many of the largest prisons in Connecticut, and thus would need to expand if the bill is ultimately implemented.

See also
Connecticut Senate

References

External links
John Kissel official website
Connecticut General Assembly - John Kissel bills introduced
Project Vote Smart - Representative John Kissel (CT) profile
Follow the Money - John A Kissel
2006 2004 2002 2000 1998 1996 campaign contributions

 

1959 births
Living people
Politicians from Worcester, Massachusetts
People from Enfield, Connecticut
University of Connecticut alumni
Western New England University alumni
Republican Party Connecticut state senators
21st-century American politicians
People from Windsor, Connecticut